Dominik Roels (born 21 January 1987, in Köln) is a former German professional road bicycle racer, who previously rode for German Team Milram. He announced his retirement in January 2011.

Palmares

2003
 2nd, National U17 Points Race Championship
2005
  U19 Road Race Champion
  U19 Points Race Champion
 1st, Overall, Münsterland Tour (U19)
 2nd, National U19 Time Trial Championship
2006
  U23 Road Race Champion
 1st, Stage 1, Vuelta a Tenerife
 2nd, National U23 Time Trial Championship

External links 

German male cyclists
1987 births
Living people
Cyclists from Cologne
21st-century German people